Amminadab is a minor character referred to in the Book of Exodus. He is the father-in-law of High Priest Aaron, brother of Moses. 

Amminadab is also mentioned in the Book of Ruth, (and also in Gospel of Mathew and Gospel of Luke), as the father of Nahshon, ancestor of King David and therefore the ancestor of Jesus.

The same name is mentioned in the Book of Samuel. This Amminadab was an Israelite mentioned in the lineage of Jacob's sons, Exodus 6:14-28. Mathew 1:1-16 shows a full record of ancestors and descendants. He likely served in the tabernacle. He was one of 112 Levites who received the great honor of bringing the Ark of the Covenant, back to Jerusalem from the Philistines.

History
According to the Biblical genealogies, he was a son of Ram (also known as Aram).  He was born during the Israelite exile in Ancient Egypt. Ram was the great-grandson of Judah. Amminadab was the father of Nahshon, chief of the tribe of Judah (Numbers 1:7; 2:3; 7:12, 17; 10:14). His daughter Elisheva was Aaron's wife (Exodus 6:23), making him Aaron's father-in-law.

Amminadab is one of the ancestors of Jesus painted in the lunettes of the Sistine chapel.

In popular culture
In the 1956 film The Ten Commandments, Amminadab is portrayed by H.B. Warner. During the Exodus, he is too old and frail to travel, so Bithiah allows him to ride in her litter.

Notes

Tribe of Judah
Book of Exodus people
Book of Ruth
Gospel of Matthew
Gospel of Luke